Stanko Mlakar Stadium, located in the Kranj Sports Centre, is a multi-purpose stadium in Kranj, Slovenia. It is mostly used for football matches and hosts the home matches of Triglav Kranj in the Slovenian Second League. In 2009, the stadium underwent a major reconstruction in which a new stand was built and the stadium now has a capacity of 2,060 seats.

International matches

See also
List of football stadiums in Slovenia

References

Football venues in Slovenia
Multi-purpose stadiums in Slovenia
Stadium
Buildings and structures in Kranj
Sports venues completed in 1963
1963 establishments in Slovenia
20th-century architecture in Slovenia